This is a list of United States state legislatures. Each state in the United States has a legislature as part of its form of civil government. Most of the fundamental details of the legislature are specified in the state constitution. With the exception of Nebraska, all state legislatures are bicameral bodies, composed of a lower house (Assembly, General Assembly, State Assembly, House of Delegates, or House of Representatives) and an upper house (Senate). The United States also has one federal district and five non-state territories with local legislative branches, which are listed below. Among the states, the Nebraska Legislature is the only state with a unicameral body. However, three other jurisdictions  the District of Columbia, Guam, and the U.S. Virgin Islands  also have unicameral bodies.

The exact names, dates, term lengths, term limits, electoral systems, electoral districts, and other details are determined by the individual states' laws.

Party summary 

Note: A party with a numerical majority in a chamber may be forced to share power with other parties due to informal coalitions or may cede power outright because of divisions within its caucus.

Statistics

State legislators by party 

 Includes legislators who are listed officially as unaffiliated, unenrolled, nonpartisan, etc. 
 Includes legislators who are from a party and don't caucus with the party.

State legislatures

Federal district and territorial legislatures

Notes

See also 

 Political party strength in U.S. states
 Comparison of U.S. state governments
 State legislature (United States)
 United States state legislatures' partisan trend
 National Conference of State Legislatures
 List of current United States governors
 List of U.S. state representatives (Alabama to Missouri)
 List of U.S. state representatives (Montana to Wyoming)
 List of U.S. state senators

References

External links 

 National Conference of State Legislatures

Legislatures-related lists
State legislatures of the United States
States of the United States-related lists